This is a list of Council of ministers from Shivraj Singh Chouhan's third cabinet of Madhya Pradesh starting from December 2013 till December 2018. Shivraj Singh Chouhan is the leader of BJP who was sworn in the Chief Minister of Madhya Pradesh in December 2013.

Council of Ministers

Minister of State

Former Ministers

See also 

 Government of Madhya Pradesh
 Madhya Pradesh Legislative Assembly

References

Bharatiya Janata Party state ministries
2013 in Indian politics
Chief Ministership of Shivraj Singh Chouhan
Chouhan 03
2013 establishments in Madhya Pradesh
2018 disestablishments in India
Cabinets established in 2013
Cabinets disestablished in 2018